Núria Añó (born 1973) is a Catalan writer and a translator. Añó has exhibited her work in universities and institutions giving papers on literary creation or authors like Elfriede Jelinek, Patricia Highsmith, Salka Viertel, Franz Werfel, Karen Blixen or Alexandre Dumas, fils, as well as giving talks in libraries and secondary and higher education centres. She is also a member of several international artistic juries.

Work 
Añó was born in Lleida, Catalonia, Spain. She started writing tales at a young age and published her first story in 1990. After that, she published in anthology books from abroad, such as the short stories 2066. Beginning the age of correction, about climate change, or Presage, about domestic violence, both translated into English.

Her first novel Els nens de l'Elisa (2006) was third among the finalists for the 24th Ramon Llull Prize for Catalan literature, one of the most relevant literary awards in Catalan language. This novel has a female main character detached from the clichés. Núria Añó draws an antiheroine through a school teacher and shows both the tender and the most sordid side.

L'escriptora morta (2008) (The Dead Writer, 2020) shows the process of creating a literary work through Anna, a writer, and the world and lives of the surrounding people. It is an "insightful literary artefact" about the process of creation and how literature reflects itself within a literary work. It "suggests images capable of depicting daily scenes that often, life does not let us see." The original was published in Spain in 2008.

Núvols baixos (2009) (Lowering Clouds, 2020) is a novel about mature women. Gabriele is a bisexual actress that takes a trip to the city where she spent her adolescence. Her friend Marianne is older and hardly remembers the actress, because she has Alzheimer's disease. Another friend, Silvia, is a housewife that must care for the grandchildren daily. Among others, it has a significant LGBT background. This novel is "a piece of real life, dissected with the razor-sharp scalpel of Añó's writing." It was published in 2009.

La mirada del fill (2012) is a novel about adoption, classic ballet dancers, and generational troubles between mothers and daughters. "Apparently understood facts, that the novel reveals at the right time, give the impression of reading a story written by scales, in which events overlap until they form a general panorama." It was published in 2012.

El salon de los artistas exiliados en California (2020) (The Salon of Exiled Artists in California, 2020) is a biography on Jewish screenwriter Salka Viertel and results from three years of an extensive research that "gives always the voice and the word to Salka Viertel." This book is about the Berlin of the 1920s and the transition from silent to spoken film in Hollywood; the rise of Hitler and what it meant for the Jewish condition. Also, the exile of many European artists because of the Second World War, the Cold War and the witch-hunt against communism; an in-depth account of many well-known and famous personalities and their interpersonal relationships. Although Salka Viertel was an important figure in the exile, "very little has been written about her, so Núria Añó's book is a corrective."

Her work, which includes novels, short stories and essays, has been published and translated into Spanish, French, English, Italian, German, Polish, Chinese, Latvian, Portuguese, Dutch, Greek, Arabic or Romanian as well.

Style
According to several academic journals of literature, Añó's work is considered "one of the big promises of the contemporary narrative for Catalan Literature."

Her writing style is very ambitious and risky, the author delves into the exploration of the contemporary individual, it focuses on the psychology of her characters, generally antiheroes avoiding Manichaeism. "The characters are the most important" in her books, "much more than the topic", due to "an introspection, a reflection, not sentimental, but feminine". Although her novels cover a multitude of topics, treat actual and socially relevant problems, injustices and poor communication between people. Frequently, the core of her stories remains unexplained, and Núria Añó asks the reader to discover the "deeper meaning" and to become involved in the events presented.

Awards
In 1996, she was awarded the 18th City of Almenara Joan Fuster Prize for Fiction. In 2016, she was distinguished by the culture association Nuoren Voiman Liitto in Sysmä, Finland. Later, she won a grant at the Shanghai Writing Program, in Shanghai, China. In 2017, she was distinguished by the Baltic Centre for Writers and Translators in Visby, Sweden. Late in the fall, by International Writer's and Translators' Center of Rhodes in Greece. In 2018, she was selected for the residency Krakow UNESCO City of Literature in Poland and she won the fourth international writing award 2018 Shanghai Get-Together. In 2019, she was distinguished by IWTH in Ventspils, Latvia, and in 2020, with the International Writing Program in Beijing, China.

Bibliography

Novels
 Els nens de l'Elisa; Omicron 2006 
 L'escriptora morta (The Dead Writer, 2020); Omicron 2008 
 Núvols baixos (Lowering Clouds, 2020); Omicron 2009 
 La mirada del fill; Abadia 2012

Biographies
 El salón de los artistas exiliados en California: Salka Viertel acogió en su exilio a actores, intelectuales prominentes y personas anónimas huidas del nazismo (The Salon of Exiled Artists in California, 2020); Smashwords 2020

Books translated into English

Work translated into other languages

Novels
 The Dead Writer; 2020  (ebook)  (paperback) (English)
 Lowering Clouds; 2020  (ebook)  (paperback) (English)
 The Salon of Exiled Artists in California: Salka Viertel took in actors, prominent intellectuals and anonymous people in exile fleeing from Nazism; 2020  (eBook)  (paperback)  (hardcover) (English)
 La escritora muerta; 2018  (ebook)   (paperback)  (audiobook);  (hardcover) (Spanish)
 La mirada del hijo; 2019  (ebook)   (paperback)  (hardcover)  (Spanish)
 Nubes bajas; 2021	 (eBook)  (paperback)  (audiobook)  (hardcover) (Spanish)
 La scrittrice morta; 2018  (eBook)  (paperback) (Italian)
 Nuvole basse; 2018  (eBook)  (paperback) (Italian)
 Lo sguardo del figlio; 2019  (eBook)  (paperback) (Italian)
 A escritora morta; 2018  (eBook)  (paperback) (Portuguese)
 O Olhar do Filho; 2018  (eBook)  (paperback) (Portuguese)
 Nuvens baixas; 2019  (eBook)  (paperback)(Portuguese)
 L'écrivaine morte; 2018  (eBook)  (paperback) (French)
 Le regard du fils; 2019  (eBook)  (paperback) (French)
 Nuages bas; 2020  (eBook)  (paperback) (French)
 De dode schrijfster; 2019  (eBook)  (paperback) (Dutch)
 De blik van de zoon; 2020  (eBook)  (paperback) (Dutch)
 Tiefe Wolken; 2019  (eBook)  (paperback) (German)
 Die tote Schriftstellerin; 2019  (eBook)  (paperback) (German)
 Der Blick des Sohnes; 2019  (eBook)  (paperback) (German)
 TO ΒΛΕΜΜΑ ΤΟΥ ΓΙΟΥ; 2019  (eBook)  (paperback) (Greek)
 Η Νεκρή Συγγραφέας; 2020  (eBook)  (paperback) (Greek)
 Χαμηλά σύννεφα; 2021  (eBook) (Greek)

Biography
 The Salon of Exiled Artists in California; 2020  (eBook)  (paperback) (English)
 Το σαλόνι των εξόριστων καλλιτεχνών στην Καλιφόρνια; 2020  (eBook) (Greek)
 Der Salon der Exilkünstler in Kalifornien; 2020  (eBook)  (paperback) (German)
 O Salão dos Artistas Exilados na Califórnia; 2021  (eBook)  (paperback) (Portuguese)
 Le salon des artistes exilés en Californie; 2021  (eBook)  (paperback) (French)
 Il salone degli artisti esiliati in California; 2021  (eBook)  (paperback) (Italian)
 De salon van artiesten in ballingschap in Californië; 2022  (eBook)  (paperback) (Dutch)

See also 
 Catalan literature
 Écriture féminine
 Spanish literature
 Translation
 Literary work

References

External links 
  

1973 births
Living people
People from Lleida
People from Segrià
Catalan-language writers
Spanish-language writers
Spanish women novelists
Novelists from Catalonia
21st-century Spanish women writers
20th-century Spanish women writers
Spanish feminist writers
20th-century Spanish novelists
21st-century Spanish novelists
Short story writers from Catalonia
Spanish women short story writers
Spanish essayists
20th-century short story writers
21st-century short story writers
20th-century essayists
21st-century essayists
Women non-fiction writers
Spanish non-fiction writers
Women biographers
21st-century biographers
Spanish biographers
Biographers of artists
Celebrity biographers